University of Cyberjaya (UoC) is a private university with a focus on healthcare programmes. The university has been operating since its establishment in 2005 and offers over 20 diploma, degree and postgraduate programmes in the fields of medicine, pharmacy, psychology, occupational safety and health, homeopathy, physiotherapy, biomedical engineering technology, paramedical sciences and postgraduate courses such as the Masters in Clinical Pharmacy, Doctory of Pharmacy, MSc and PhD in Medical Sciences and Allied Health sciences. UoC was awarded a Tier 5 - Excellent rating by the Malaysian Qualifications Agency. It is in Cyberjaya, in Sepang District, Selangor, Malaysia.

The university has an enrollment of 6,000 undergraduate and postgraduate students across five faculties, two academic centres, and six hospital teaching resource centres.

History
University of Cyberjaya was established by a group of prominent medical specialist and educators on 23 October 2005. The institution originally consisted of two faculties offering two bachelor's degree programmes in medicine and pharmacy. It operated out of its first campus at Street Mall, Cyberjaya.

In 2009, UoC moved to its present location in anticipation student growth. The campus offered increased student capacity and fully equipped teaching facilities.

In 2010, three additional faculties were established to offer allied health science, occupational safety & health, and complementary medicine programmes.

Dato' Prof. Dr. Abu Abdullah was appointed as the new President on 4 January 2010. In the same year UoC created history when it signed a Memorandum of Understanding (MOU) with the Malaysian Homeopathic Medical Council, thus becoming the first Malaysian university to recognize and offer a homeopathic medical science degree programme.

By 2013 facing intense regulatory and financial pressure in a fast-evolving landscape, the institution was acquired by SMR Group, who went about implementing a turn-around. The new owners sought to improve governance by establishing a new leadership team, re-allocating resources to improve quality and modernizing the university's operations to improve efficiency. Largely successful, in two years, Cyberjaya University College of Medical Sciences had improved its financial standing and quality. The turn-around and human resource improvement initiatives were acknowledged as a success by the US-based, management and leadership magazine, Workforce, when it awarded the university with its 2015 Optimas Gold Award for Managing Change.

In October 2014, the university revealed plans to collaborate with HCK Capital Group to build a new campus in Cyberjaya which is expected to be operational by 2018.

Leadership
In 2014, University of Cyberjaya installed as its inaugural chancellor, Yang Teramat Mulia Dato' Seri DiRaja Tan Sri Tunku Sallehuddin Ibni Almarhum Sultan Badlishah, the then Tunku Temengong or second in-line to the throne of the Malaysian State of Kedah. Tunku Sallehuddin stepped down as the Chancellor when he was proclaimed as the new Sultan of Kedah on 12 September 2017, upon the death of his elder half brother, Sultan Abdul Halim Mu'adzam Shah.

On 23 November 2019, Prof. Emeritus Tan Sri Datuk Dr. Anuwar bin Ali, an economist and exponent of higher education was installed as the university's new Chancellor.

As part of the SMR Group's turn-around plan in 2014, a new leadership team was appointed with a clear mandate to improve governance and management at the university. In light of this, Prof. Emeritus Dato’ Dr. Mohamad Abdul Razak was appointed as the new  Vice Chancellor. Dr. Mohamad Razak is a trained orthopaedic surgeon specialist and former deputy vice chancellor and hospital director of the Malaysian National University as well as the president of the Malaysian Orthopaedic Association. He is also a visiting registrar of the Orthopaedic Department at the University of Edinburgh, in addition to being registrar and spinal injury fellow at the Southport Spinal Injuries Centre in Liverpool.

After its acquisition by SMR Group, the university established a new Board of Governors to provide oversight over matters such as the university's financial management, business operations, future development and overall quality of the education. The Board also functions as advisers to the university management in guiding the overall direction and strategy.  The board consist of accomplished Malaysian academic & industry leaders such as Major General (Rtd.) Dato' Pahlawan Dr. R. Mohanadas, former Director General of Health Services, Malaysian Armed Forces and Dato’ Asariah Mior Shaharuddin, the former Deputy Director-General of Education and recipient of Malaysia's National Education Leadership Award 2019.

Faculties and programmes
The university has nine faculties and two academic centres — all of which are in the main campus building in Cyberjaya. All study programmes are offered at this campus with clinical training conducted at partner hospitals and other healthcare organizations.

Faculty of Business and Accounting 

 Diploma in Business Administration
 Diploma in Accounting
 Bachelor in Business Administration (Hons)
 Bachelor in International Business Management
 Bachelor in Accounting and Finance

Faculty of Information Technology 

 Diploma in Information Technology
 Bachelor in Information Technology

Faculty of Medicine
The Faculty of Medicine at UoC is one of the founding faculties of the University. The first batch of students were enrolled in 2005 and graduated in 2010. The current dean is Mejar General (Rtd) Prof Dato' Dr Mohd Zin Bidin, the former Director of Health at the Ministry of Defense and the Founding Dean of Medicine at the National Defense University of Malaysia. The faculty offers the following programme:
Bachelor of Medicine & Bachelor of Surgery (MBBS)
Master of Medical Science (MSc)
Master of Science in Public Health (Global Health)
Doctor of Philosophy in Medical Science

Faculty of Nursing 

 Diploma in Nursing
 Bachelor in Nursing

Faculty of Pharmacy
Established since the founding of the university, the Faculty of Pharmacy at UoC is the first and only school in Malaysia to offer a Doctor of Pharmacy (DPharm) and the only private institute of higher education in Malaysia to offer a Master in Clinical Pharmacy. Its postgraduate study on Clinical Pharmacy was developed in collaboration with the University of Southern California who also serves as its external examiner. Professor Dr. Rosnani Hashim, a former member of the Drug Control Authority (DCA), Ministry of Health and a member of the Pharmacy Board of Malaysia and National Accreditation Committee for Pharmacy Education was made Dean of the Faculty. The faculty offers the following programmes:
Diploma in Cosmetics
Bachelor of Pharmacy
Master in Clinical Pharmacy
Master of Pharmaceutical Sciences
Doctor of Pharmacy
Doctor of Philosophy (PhD) Pharmaceutical Sciences

Faculty of Psychology 

 Diploma in Psychology
 Bachelor of Psychology (Hons)
 Master of Clinical Psychology

Faculty of Allied Health Sciences
The Faculty of Allied Health Sciences is the largest faculty at UoC in student enrollment and programmes offered. It was established in 2010 and is led by its dean, Prof. Dr Nasaruddin, who has vast experiences in the field of medicine and anatomy. The Faculty of Allied Health Sciences has formed partnerships with a number of Malaysian colleges who are allowed to deliver its diploma programmes off-campus.

The faculty offers the following programmes:
Bachelor of Physiotherapy (Hons)
Bachelor of Biomedical Engineering Technology (Hons)
Diploma in Paramedical Sciences
Diploma in Medical Assistant

Faculty of Occupational Safety & Health
Professor Dr Mohamad Khan, an occupational safety and health expert, was appointed the dean of the Faculty of Occupational Safety & Health at its establishment in 2010. The faculty works in close partnership with the Ministry of Defense, Malaysia and heavy industry players to offer postgraduate studies for military personnel in the field of Occupational Safety & Health. The faculty offers the following programmes:
Master of Science in Occupational Safety and Health Management
Bachelor in Occupational Safety and Health (Hons)
Diploma in Occupational Safety and Health

Faculty of Traditional & Complementary Medicine
One of the latest additions to the university, the Faculty of Traditional & Complementary Medicine was established in support of the Ministry of Health's efforts to integrate traditional and complementary medicine into the Malaysian national health system.
  
The faculty collaborates with the National Academy of Homoeopathy, India for clinical training. The current dean is Asst. Prof. Ibrahim Usman Mhaisker who received his master's degree, Doctor of Medicine in Homeopathy [M.D. (Hom.)] from B. A. Marathwada University, Aurangabad (India). The faculty offers the following programme:
Bachelor of Homeopathic Medical Science (Hons)

Notable alumni
Sanjna Suri - beauty pageant titleholder, singer, model, actress and former pharmacist.

See also
 List of universities in Malaysia

References

External links

 University of Cyberjaya
 SMR Group

Private universities and colleges in Malaysia
2005 establishments in Malaysia
Educational institutions established in 2005
Medical schools in Malaysia
Universities and colleges in Selangor